Rata may refer to:

Biology
 Some plants of the genus Metrosideros from New Zealand, including:
 Metrosideros albiflora (Large white rātā)
 Metrosideros bartlettii (Bartlett's rātā or Cape Reinga white rātā)
 Metrosideros carminea (Carmine rātā)
 Metrosideros colensoi (Colenso's rātā)
 Metrosideros diffusa (White rātā)
 Metrosideros fulgens (Scarlet rātā)
 Metrosideros parkinsonii (Parkinson's rātā)
 Metrosideros perforata (Small white rātā)
 Metrosideros robusta (Northern rātā)
 Metrosideros umbellata (Southern rātā)
 The mangosteen tree Garcinia dulcis of Indonesia
Rata (crab), a genus of crabs

Mythology
 Rātā (Māori mythology)
 Rata (Tahitian mythology)
 Rata (Tuamotu mythology)
 Laka, a figure in Hawaiian mythology

Places
 Rata, New Zealand, near Hunterville
 Tanah Rata, a town in Malaysia
 Malaya Rata, a region of Sri Lanka
 Maya Rata, medieval kingdom in Sri Lanka
 Te Rata Bridge, New Zealand
 Rata (Bug), a tributary of the river Bug in Lviv Oblast, Ukraine

Rivers in Romania
 Rața, a tributary of the Dâmbovnic in Argeș County
 Rața, a tributary of the Izvorul Alb in Bacău County
 Rața, a tributary of the Lunca in Harghita County
 Rața, a tributary of the Uz in Bacău County

Other
 Rata (name)
 Rață
 Rata ("rat"), nickname of the Polikarpov I-16 fighter in the Spanish Civil War
 Finnish Financial Supervisory Authority, earlier in Finnish Rahoitustarkastuslaitos Rata
 TxpA-RatA toxin-antitoxin system (RNA anti-toxin A)
 Rata Blanca, an Argentinian heavy metal band
 Rata Blanca (album), their 1988 album
 Rata Blanca VII, their 1997 album
 Rata railway station, a former station on the North Island Main Trunk, New Zealand

See also
 Pro rata